The 2019–20 Aruban Division di Honor was the 59th season of the  Division di Honor, the top division football competition in Aruba. The season began on 22 September 2019.

On 13 March 2020, the season was suspended due to the coronavirus pandemic. On 17 June, the league voted to abandon the remainder of the season.

Changes from 2018–19 season 
Caiquetio and River Plate were relegated to the  Division Uno and replaced by the promoted Caravel and United.

Teams 

There are 10 clubs that competed this season.

Regular season

Results

References

External links
Arubaanse Voetbal Bond

Aruban Division di Honor seasons
Aruba
1
Aruban Division di Honor, 2019-20